Bartlett is an unincorporated community in Shannon County, in the U.S. state of Missouri.

History
A post office called Bartlett was established in 1888, and remained in operation until 1941. The community has the name of W. R. Bartlett, a railroad promoter.

References

Unincorporated communities in Shannon County, Missouri
Unincorporated communities in Missouri